Ganabatirau s/o Veraman (born 6 June 1973)is a Malaysian politician who has served as Member of the Selangor State Executive Council (EXCO) in the Pakatan Rakyat (PR) and Pakatan Harapan (PH) state administrations under Menteris Besar Khalid Ibrahim, Azmin Ali and Amirudin Shari since May 2013 and Member of the Selangor State Legislative Assembly (MLA) for Kota Kemuning since May 2018 and Kota Alam Shah from May 2013 to May 2018. He is a member of the Democratic Action Party (DAP), a component party of the state ruling but federal opposition PH coalition. He has served as Assistant National Publicity Secretary of DAP since March 2022 and is also the State Vice Chairman of DAP of Selangor.

Personal background
Born and raised in Teluk Intan, Perak, Ganabatirau excelled at school and became a lawyer.

Political career
Ganabatirau's political career started during his teenage years for more than thirty years following his grandfather's legacy as a Freedom Fighter of Malaysia. He became active in non-governmental organisation (NGOs) committed to increase the awareness of human rights and heritage in a multiracial Malaysia. Between April to May 2006, several legal Hindu temples were demolished by city hall authorities in Malaysia. On 21 April 2006, the Malaimel Sri Selva Kaliamman Temple in Kuala Lumpur was reduced to rubble its the city hall sent in bulldozers. Ganabatirau and thirty Hindu NGOS joined as a coalition named The Hindu Rights Action Force or HINDRAF, a coalition of several NGOs have protested these demolitions by lodging complaints with the Prime Minister of Malaysia but have received no response. According to a lawyer for HINDRAF, a Hindu temple is demolished in Malaysia every three weeks. Ganabatirau was a dominant figure in HINDRAF followed by Waytha Moorthy Ponnusamy, Manoharan Malayaram and Uthayakumar Ponnusamy organised a series of peaceful weekend Human rights forums throughout Malaysia to increase the awareness of Hindu human rights.

On 23 November 2007, Ganabatirau, together with two HINDRAF lawyers Waytha Moorthy, and Uthayakumar, were arrested and charged under the Sedition Act/Internal Security Act (ISA). However, in a series of repeated arrests and releases, the courts could not prove that they had incited racial hatred. The only evidence against them were unreliable translations of their Tamil speeches into Bahasa Malaysia presented by the Attorney-General's Chambers, which the courts deemed as unverifiable. Eventually, they were all acquitted due to a shaky prosecution and the lack of evidence of any wrongdoing or crime. They were released on 5 April 2009 after Datuk Seri Najib Razak became Prime Minister of Malaysia.

Ganabatirau was then recruited into DAP shortly after his release from Kamunting Detention Centre, a Supermax prison located near the town of Taiping, Perak. While running his own law firm, he also volunteered to be appointed as a councillor of the Shah Alam City Council and help DAP to solve local issues in Shah Alam. In the 2013 general election, Ganabatirau contested for the first time and won the State Constituency for Kota Alam Shah on a DAP ticket and was promoted to be one of the EXCO member of Selangor State government.

During Ganabatirau's first tenure as EXCO of Selangor State Government, Selangor experienced a period of rapid economic growth and restructuring and Ganabatirau said that  his main priorities were to solve poverty issues, school and education's funding, flash floods, water provision, temple's land issue and  Malaysian Birth certification/Identification Card issues.

Election results

References 

Democratic Action Party (Malaysia) politicians
21st-century Malaysian politicians
Members of the Selangor State Legislative Assembly
Selangor state executive councillors
Living people
People from Selangor
Malaysian people of Indian descent
1973 births